Rolf Otto Andvord (31 October 1890 – 8 March 1976) was a Norwegian jurist and diplomat.

Biography
He was born in Sør-Aurdal as a son of Kristian Andvord (1855–1934), a chief physician, and Ebba Blomstedt (1860–1953). He was a nephew of ship-owner Rolf Andvord. He was married to the banker's daughter Ingrid Anna Kristina Sten from 1930 to 1936. His daughter Ingegjerd married the business magnate Harald Løvenskiold. His second daughter Anita married Ulf Ander.

Upon finishing his secondary education in 1909, he enrolled in law studies in 1910 and graduated with a cand.jur. degree in 1915. He thereupon started working for the Norwegian Ministry of Foreign Affairs. In 1921 he became chargé d'affaires at the Norwegian legation in Copenhagen, and soon after secretary at the Norwegian legation in Paris, and he was also assisting secretary in the Ministry of Foreign Affairs and worked at the Norwegian legation in London. From 1935 he served as ambassador to Argentina, with side accreditations to Bolivia, Chile, Paraguay, Peru and Uruguay. He also served as a consul-general in Buenos Aires. Before the war he also took part in several League of Nations meetings.

In 1941 he was sent to the Soviet Union, with a side mission in Iran. In 1942 he was given the rank of ambassador to the Soviet Union. From 1946 to 1948 he was the permanent under-secretary of state in the Ministry of Foreign Affairs, from 1948 to 1958 he was the Norwegian ambassador to France and from 1958 to 1961 in Spain.

He was decorated with the Grand Cross of the Royal Norwegian Order of St. Olav in 1946. He also received the Grand Crosses of the Order of the Dannebrog, the French Légion d'honneur, the Spanish Order of Isabella the Catholic, the Peruvian Order of the Sun, the Order of Homayoun and the Order of Merit of Chile. He was a Commander of the Portuguese Order of Christ, the Order of St Alexander and the  Order of Polonia Restituta, and a Grand Knight of the Order of the Falcon. He also received the Haakon VII Anniversary Medal in 1955 as well as the King George V Silver Jubilee Medal and the King Christian X's Liberty Medal. In 1964 he published his memoirs. He died in March 1976 in Málaga.

War Effort
During his stay in Moscow, in service as Ambassador, he approached the KGB and enrolled as a spy, conveying trusted information about the west-allied's operations.  He writes in his autobiography: It occurred to me that the most efficient way would be to stay connected to the almighty institution behind it all: the secret police, and through this channel supply the leaders of the Soviet Union with correct informations in order to improve their war effort.

As a spy, according to author Alf R. Jacobsen, he would have contributed little in excess of what KGB knew from other sources during the war. The same writer points out the Andvord praises Soviet society, and does - not even in retrospect - reflect to any great extent over the sufferings and terror endured by the Russian and Ukrainian peoples under Stalin and his regime, which he served in secrecy. He mentions in his memoirs how the authorities managed to convey to him a large shipment of Bordeaux wine, via Argentine and Siberia, in a heated wagon, as not to damage it.
His most valuable contribution to Soviet intelligence would have been in the post-war years, when he served as under-secretary in the ministry of foreign affairs.

References

1890 births
1976 deaths
People from Sør-Aurdal
Norwegian civil servants
Ambassadors of Norway to Argentina
Ambassadors of Norway to Bolivia
Ambassadors of Norway to Chile
Ambassadors of Norway to Paraguay
Ambassadors of Norway to Peru
Ambassadors of Norway to Uruguay
Ambassadors of Norway to the Soviet Union
Ambassadors of Norway to France
Ambassadors of Norway to Spain
Grand Croix of the Légion d'honneur
Grand Crosses of the Order of the Dannebrog
Knights Grand Cross of the Order of Isabella the Catholic
Grand Crosses of the Order of the Sun of Peru
Commanders of the Order of Christ (Portugal)
Commanders of the Order of Polonia Restituta
Grand Knights of the Order of the Falcon
Norwegian memoirists
Recipients of the St. Olav's Medal
20th-century memoirists